American Nightmare may refer to:

Entertainment
Alan Wake's American Nightmare, a 2012 video game
The American Nightmare (2000 film), a feature-length documentary directed by Adam Simon
American Nightmare (film), a 1983 Canadian horror film
"American Nightmare" (Supernatural), a television episode
American Nightmare (band), former name of Give Up the Ghost, an American hardcore punk band
"American Nightmare", a song by Misfits from Legacy of Brutality
"The American Nightmare", a song by Ice Nine Kills from their 2018 album The Silver Scream
The Stand: American Nightmares, a comic book by Marvel comics

People with the nickname
 Cody Rhodes (1985), an American professional wrestler
 Goldust (1969), an American professional wrestler

See also
Going Rouge: Sarah Palin, An American Nightmare, a collection of essays edited by Richard Kim and Betsy Reed
All American Nightmare, an album by Hinder
"The Great American Nightmare", a song by Rob Zombie